DO-242A is an aviation system standard published by RTCA, Incorporated. It contains minimum aviation system performance standards (MASPS) for Automatic Dependent Surveillance-Broadcast (ADS-B).  These standards specify operational characteristics that should be useful to designers, manufacturers, installers, service providers and users of an ADS-B system intended for operational use on an international basis.  DO-242A provides a view of the system-wide operational use of ADS-B, but does not describe a specific technical implementation or design architecture meeting these operational and technical characteristics.

Outline of contents
Purpose and Scope
Introduction
System Overview
Operational Applications
Verification Procedures
Operational Requirements
General Requirements
System Performance - Standard Operational Conditions
ADS-B System Definition and Functional Requirements
System Scope and Definition of Terms
ADS-B System Description
System Requirements
ADS-B Messages and Reports
ADS-B Subsystem Requirements
ADS-B Functional Level Requirements
Procedures for Requirement Verification
Appendix A:  Acronyms
Appendix B:  Definition of Terms
Appendix C:  Bibliography and References
Appendix D:  Near-Term ADS-B Applications
Appendix E:  Other Applications
Appendix F:  Efficient Spectrum Utilization
Appendix G:  Design Tradeoff Considerations
Appendix H:  Receive Antenna Coverage Constraints
Appendix I:  Integrity Considerations for ADS-B Applications
Appendix J:  Accuracy and Update Period Analysis
Appendix K:  Latency and Report Time Error Data
Appendix L:  Track Acquisition and Maintenance Requirements
Appendix M:  Examples of On-Condition Report Formats
Appendix N:  Intent Guidance Material for Future ADS-B Intent Broadcast
Appendix O:  Determination of Intent Information Exchange Requirements for Air-Air Encounter Alerting and De-Confliction
Appendix Q:  Future Air-Referenced Velocity (ARV) Broadcast Conditions
Appendix R:  Determining the Navigation Accuracy Category for Velocity

See also
Automatic Dependent Surveillance-Broadcast
DO-212, Minimum Operational Performance Standards for Airborne ADS Equipment
DO-185A, Minimum Operational Performance Standards for Traffic Alert and Collision Avoidance System (TCAS) Airborne Equipment
DO-184, Traffic Alert Collision Avoidance System (TCAS) I Functional Guidelines
DO-236A, Minimum Aviation System Performance Standards: Required Navigation Performance for Area Navigation
DO-243, Guidance for Initial Implementation of Cockpit Display of Traffic Information
DO-229D, Minimum Operational Performance Standards for Global Positioning System/Wide Area Augmentation System Airborne Equipment
DO-260, Minimum Operational Performance Standards for 1090 MHz Automatic Dependent Surveillance - Broadcast (ADS-B)
DO-259, Application Descriptions for Initial Cockpit Display of Traffic Information (CDTI) Applications
DO-246B, GNSS-Based Precision Approach Local Area Augmentation System (LAAS) Signal-in-Space Interface Control Document (ICD)
DO-253, Minimum Operational Performance Standards for GPS Local Area Augmentation System Airborne Equipment
DO-245, Minimum Aviation System Performance Standards for the Local Area Augmentation System (LAAS)

RTCA standards
Aviation standards